Nhlangano Airfield  is an airport serving Nhlangano, a town in the Shiselweni Region of Eswatini.

The runway is on the southeast side of the town, and has an additional  of unpaved overrun on each end.

See also
Transport in Eswatini
List of airports in Eswatini

References

External links
 OpenStreetMap - Nhlangano Airport
 OurAirports - Nhlangano Airport
 FallingRain - Nhlangano
 
 Google Earth

Airports in Eswatini